Can't Wait to See the Movie  is the seventh solo studio album by English singer, songwriter and actor Roger Daltrey, the lead vocalist for the Who. It was released in June 1987 by Atlantic Records, and was primarily produced by Alan Shacklock, in association with David Foster, Chas Sanford and Jimmy Scott. Among the songs Daltrey is credited as co-writer on two tracks "Balance on Wires" and "Take Me Home".  David Foster co-wrote the track "The Price of Love", which was also featured in the 1987 movie The Secret of My Success, starring Michael J. Fox.

Can't Wait to See the Movie is a pop album that incorporates some genres such as funk, rock, and jazz, and it makes prominent use of synthesizers. The album was received negatively by the majority of music critics, with some critics describing its music as inauthentic and bemoaning the production as too polished. It was also a commercial disappointment, missing the album charts in Europe and the US. One critic referred to it as "Can't Wait to Sell the Record," while other reviewers noted good points to the recordings. When asked about the album at the time, Daltrey said that "It's amazing after all these years how everything can become new and fun again."

Composition
The album's only UK top 100 hit, "Hearts of Fire", was written by Russ Ballard. Ballard played guitar on this track, as well as providing backing vocals. Ballard also wrote and performed on Daltrey's first two solo studio albums, Daltrey (1973) and Ride a Rock Horse (1975). Daltrey recorded some other Ballard originals for his McVicar soundtrack and his previous studio album Under a Raging Moon. This album remains his final contribution from Ballard.

Critical reception
Reviewing for AllMusic, critic Mike DeGagne wrote of the album "Knowing the potential that is harnessed within Daltrey, his half-hearted attempts at unleashing the pains built up by failed romances doesn't add up to much. Some uplifting sax played by Gary Barnacle keeps the album from being a total write-off as it surfaces here and there, but a lifeless array of synthesizers droning in the backdrop of every song nullifies even the smallest asset, while adding to the pretentiousness."

Track listing
The original US album track listing is as follows:

Personnel

Musicians
 Roger Daltrey – lead vocals, backing vocals
 David Foster – keyboards
 Nick Glennie-Smith – keyboards
 Mark Morgan – keyboards
 Don Snow – keyboards
 John Van Tongeren – keyboards
 Russ Ballard – guitar, backing vocals
 Gary Grainger – guitar
 Michael Landau – guitar
 Clem Clempson – guitar
 Chas Sandford – guitar
 Chris Sandford – guitar
 Phil Brown – bass guitar, guitar, rhythm guitar
 John Siegler – bass guitar
 Tris Imboden – drums, drum overdubs
 Tony Beard – drums, rums
 Martin Ditcham – percussion
 Rev. Dave Boruff – saxophone, synthesizer
 Gary Barnacle – saxophone  
 Bimbo Acock – saxophone
 Chris Eaton – backing vocals
 Lance Ellington – backing vocals
 John Payne – backing vocals
 Jimmy Scott – backing vocals
 Miriam Stockley – backing vocals
 Mark Williamson – backing vocals
 Annie McCaig – backing vocals
 Joho Payee – backing vocals

Production and artwork
 Alan Shacklock – record producer
 David Foster – record producer
 Jimmy Scott – executive producer
 Chas Sandford – executive producer
 Noel Harris – production assistant
 Paul Batchelor – production assistant
 Mark Frank – engineer
 Richard Niles – horn arrangements
 Michael Boddicker – synthesizer programming
 Marc A. Frank – remixing 
 Graham Hughes – concept, photography
 "Ozzie" – artwork, typesetting 
 Garnet Warren – design, typography

See also
Roger Daltrey discography

References

External links
 

1987 albums
Roger Daltrey albums
Albums produced by David Foster
Atlantic Records albums
Wounded Bird Records albums
Pop rock albums by English artists
Synth-pop albums by English artists
Albums produced by Alan Shacklock